Véronique Lathuraz  (born 2 July 1968) is a French ski mountaineer.

Selected results 
 1997:
 3rd, French national ranking
 1998:
 3rd, French national ranking
 2001:
 8th, European Championship team race (together with Anne Laure Fourneaux)
 2002:
 1st, French Championship single
 3rd, World Championship team race (together with Nathalie Bourillon)
 7th, World Championship combination ranking
 10th, World Championship single race
 2003:
 3rd, European Championship team race (together with Corinne Favre)
 9th, European Championship single race
 2004
 2nd, World Championship relay race (together with Nathalie Bourillon and Delphine Oggeri)
 5th, World Championship team race (together with Nathalie Bourillon)
 6th, World Championship combination ranking
 7th, World Championship single race
 2005:
 1st, Tour du Rutor (together with Nathalie Bourillon)
 4th, European Championship relay race (together with Nathalie Bourillon and Valentine Fabre)
 8th, European Championship team race (together with Nathalie Bourillon)
 2006:
 3rd, World Championship relay race (together with Carole Toïgo, Nathalie Bourillon and Corinne Favre)
 5th, World Championship team race (together with Nathalie Bourillon)
 2007:
 2nd, European Championship team race (together with Corinne Favre)
 2nd, European Championship ralley race (together with Corinne Favre and Laëtitia Roux)
 5th, European Championship combination ranking
 2008:
 3rd, World Championship relay race (together with Corinne Favre, Nathalie Bourillon and Valentine Fabre)
 5th, World Championship team race (together with Valentine Fabre)
 6th, World Championship vertical race
 7th, World Championship long distance race
 2009:
 1st, Sci Alpinistica dell'Adamello
 1st, Transclautana
 3rd, European Championship relay race (together with Corinne Favre and Laëtitia Roux)

Patrouille des Glaciers 

 1998, 3rd, together with Danielle Hacquard and Corinne Favre
 2006: 2nd, together with Nathalie Bourillon and Corinne Favre

Trofeo Mezzalama 

 1999: 1st, together with Gloriana Pellissier and Danielle Hacquard
 2007: 2nd, together with Nathalie Bourillon and Corinne Favre

Pierra Menta 

 1997: 2nd, together with Danielle Hacquard
 1998: 2nd, together with Danielle Hacquard
 1999: 3rd, together with Alexia Zuberer
 2000: 5th, together with Sigrid Tomio
 2002: 3rd, together with Véronique Lathuraz
 2005: 2nd, together with Nathalie Bourillon
 2007: 3rd, together with Valentine Fabre
 2008: 4th, together with Corinne Favre
 2009: 3rd, together with Laëtitia Roux

References

External links 
 Véronique Lathuraz at SkiMountaineering.org

1968 births
Living people
French female ski mountaineers
21st-century French women